The Treaty of Moscow may refer to
Treaty of Moscow (1920), a non-aggression pact between Soviet Russia and Georgia  
Soviet–Lithuanian Peace Treaty (1920) also known as Moscow Peace Treaty, a treaty between the Soviet Russia and Lithuania
Treaty of Moscow (1921), a friendship treaty between Soviet Russia and the Grand National Assembly of Turkey (TBMM)
Treaty of Moscow (1939), also known as the Molotov–Ribbentrop Pact or the Treaty of Non-Aggression between Germany and the Soviet Union
Moscow Peace Treaty (1940), a treaty between the Soviet Union and Finland, ending the Winter War.
Moscow Treaty (1963), also known as the Partial Test Ban Treaty, banned nuclear weapon tests in the atmosphere, in outer space and under water>
Treaty of Moscow (1970), a treaty between the Soviet Union and West Germany
Russia–Chechen Peace Treaty (1997) also known as Moscow Peace Treaty, a treaty between the Russia and the Chechen Republic of Ichkeria
Treaty of Moscow (2002) also known as Treaty on Strategic Offensive Reductions (SORT), a treaty between Russia and the United States for a reduction in strategic nuclear warheads

Also:
Moscow Agreement (1945) — issued at the end of the Moscow Conference of 1945 — was a joint declaration by the Allies which covered a number of issues resulting from the end of World War II.